Turbulent jet breakup is the phenomena of the disintegration of a liquid/gas jet due to turbulent forces acting either on the surface of the jet or present within the jet itself. Turbulent jet breakup is mainly caused by an interplay of aerodynamic forces (e.g. drag acting on the jet surface) and/or by the internal turbulence forces within the jet (e.g. cavitation, eddies) itself.

Turbulence